Reanna Gail Browne (born 1 December 1983) is a former Australian cricketer. An all-rounder, she bowls right-arm leg break and is a right-handed batter. Born in Longreach, Queensland, Browne represented her home state in 21 List A matches between the 2002–03 and 2007–08 seasons of the Women's National Cricket League (WNCL). Reanna represented the Australian under 19's and Shooting Stars women's cricket teams. 

Reanna also represented Australia in Gaelic football in 2005 touring Ireland. 

Reanna is an academically trained and practicing Futurist, with a Master of Strategic Foresight from Swinburne University.

References

External links
 
 
 13-player Australian squad named to take on New Zealand at ESPNcricinfo

1983 births
Living people
Australian cricketers
Australian women cricketers
Cricketers from Queensland
Sportswomen from Queensland
Queensland Fire cricketers